Algo de mi vida (English: Something of my life) is an album by Mexican pop singer Yuri. It was released in 1988. The album was edited by EMI Capitol when Yuri left the company to join CBS Records. The company decided to include unpublished songs that were not incorporated in any previous releases, with the exception of the track "Amores clandestinos" (Clandestine loves) included in her album Aire. This album also has a speech of Yuri where she relates the beginning of her career, it also has several covers like "Maquillaje" (Make-up) of Mecano, "No sucederá más" (It won't happened anymore) from the Italian song "Non succedera più" of the singer Claudia Mori, "Cassette de amor" (Love cassette) of Dulce and "Frente a frente" (Face to face) of Jeanette. There was a single from this album, but it was edited only in Spain.

Track listing

Production
 Executive producer: EMI Capitol de México
 Musical arrangements: Gian Pietro Felisatti, Rafael Pérez Botija, Rafael Trabuchelli, A. Serrano, Jesús Glück, Bebu Silvetti, Julio Jaramillo
 Graphic design: J. Vicente Diosdado G.

Singles
 Amores clandestinos

References

1988 albums
Yuri (Mexican singer) albums